Seven ships of the Royal Navy have borne the name HMS Recruit:

 was an 18-gun  launched in 1806 and sold in 1822.
 was a 10-gun  launched in 1829. She foundered in 1832.
 was a 12-gun iron brig launched in 1846 and sold in 1849. She was then converted to a screw ship and was resold into civilian service under the name Harbinger.
 was an iron paddle gunboat, launched in 1850 and previously the Prussian ship Salamander.  She was exchanged in 1855 together with the Prussian Nix for the fifth rate . Recruit was sold in 1869.
 was a  launched in 1896 and sunk by German U-boat  in 1915.
 was an  launched in 1916 and sunk by U-boat  in 1917.
 was an  launched in 1943 and broken up in 1965.

Royal Navy ship names